This is a listing of the municipalities of Estonia by the population size as of 2005 and 2010.

The land area is expressed in km², and the density is expressed in inhabitants per km² of land area.

See also 

 List of the most populated municipalities in the Nordic countries

 
Municipalities of Estonia by population
Estoniar
Estonia